Dumaresq is a surname, and may refer to:

 Charles Édouard Armand-Dumaresq, French painter
 Daniel Dumaresq, Channel Islands-born Anglican priest, who served as an educational advisor to the Russian and Polish monarchies
 Edward Dumaresq (1802–1906), landowner in Van Diemen's Land
 Elie Dumaresq (1674-1754), Seigneur of Augres, Jersey
 Henry Dumaresq (1839–1924), Australian politician  
 John Saumarez Dumaresq, Australian-born Royal Navy officer
 Michelle Dumaresq, Canadian professional downhill mountain-biker
 Philip Dumaresq (c. 1650–1690), Seigneur of Samarès, Jersey
 William Dumaresq (1793–1868), English-born Australian politician.